George Freeman (born April 10, 1927) is an American jazz guitarist and recording artist. He is known for his sophisticated technique, collaborations with high-profile performers, and notable presence in the jazz scene of Chicago, Illinois. He is the younger brother of tenor saxophonist Von Freeman and drummer Eldridge "Bruz" Freeman, and the uncle of tenor saxophonist and trumpeter Chico Freeman.

Early life
Freeman was born on April 10, 1927 in Chicago, Illinois. His parents were amateur musicians- his father a trombonist and his mother a guitarist and singer. His father, George Sr., was a Chicago police officer who regularly befriended musicians at the South Side clubs on his beat, most notably the Grand Terrace Ballroom. As a result, Louis Armstrong, Earl Hines, Fats Waller, and other foundational jazz musicians frequently visited the Freeman home.

Freeman's siblings went on to become professional musicians—Eldridge played drums, and Von the tenor saxophone. Freeman himself would come to play the guitar, inspired by his visits as a teenager to the Rhumboogie Cafe in the early 1940s. There, he saw T-Bone Walker play, and the crowd's ecstatic response to Walker motivated him to learn the guitar. 

Wind players such as Von and later Charlie Parker informed Freeman's basic approach to music. He further refined his skills while attending DuSable High School, whose students included Von, Gene Ammons, Johnny Griffin, Red Holloway, Clifford Jordan, John Gilmore, Wilbur Ware, Dinah Washington, Sonny Cohn, Richard Davis, and other esteemed musicians.

Career
During his teenage years, Freeman was invited to play with The Dukes of Swing, a band led by Eugene Wright. Shortly after, wanting more opportunities to solo, he started his own band, performing mainly at the ballroom of the Pershing Hotel at 64th and Cottage Grove. By 1946 Freeman was fronting Chicago's first modern-jazz bebop band, a band that included alto saxophonist Henry Pryor and trumpeter Robert Gay. Freeman-led bands also backed visiting musicians such as Coleman Hawkins and Lester Young. Notably, during the engagement with Young, the saxophonist called for his recently-recorded song D.B. Blues. In response, Freeman surprised Young by playing his solo note-for-note, a custom he'd previously cultivated with his Chicago audience.

1947-1949: New York City
In 1947, shortly after his 20th birthday, Freeman traveled to New York with his high school friend Johnny Griffin – who previously had left Chicago to tour with the Lionel Hampton band – to join the band he was forming with trumpeter Joe Morris. Over the next year, Freeman met and listened to notable artists in the bebop genre. He also gave a solo guitar concert in Philadelphia for an audience consisting of a young Fats Navarro and John Coltrane.

Freeman made his first recordings with the Joe Morris band in late 1947, first on the Manor label, and then on the fledgling Atlantic label.  The band's sound was a blend of R&B and jazz.  In contrast, Freeman's solos resided in the world of bebop mostly, although his iconoclastic approach sometimes defied categorization.  His extended solo feature on Boogie Woogie Joe, recorded in late 1947, has been described by a rock music writer as pioneering rock and roll:  "In short, he offers up the first scintillating guitar workout in rock history."

Freeman also gave Joe Morris, and Atlantic Records, their first hit.  Back in Chicago, a favorite of the dancers was an original blues by Freeman called The Hulk; Griffin asked Freeman if the Morris band could record the tune for Atlantic.  Freeman consented.  The band recorded the tune and renamed it Lowe Groovin, a title derived from the name of a Washington, D.C. disk jockey named Jackson Lowe.  But when the record came out in 1948, the composition was credited on the label to Morris, not Freeman.  Freeman quit the band and returned to Chicago in response.

1950-1959: Collaboration with Charlie Parker and The Groover
Back at home, Freeman reassumed his prominent place in the Chicago music scene, often teaming with his brothers at the Pershing Hotel.  Highlights of this period were late 1950-early 1951 collaborations with Charlie Parker--twice in Chicago and once in Detroit.  The musical and personal rapport between Parker and the Freemans was immediate.  Von at one point lent a tieless Parker his brother George's tie--Parker never returned it and subsequently wore it in publicity photos, including one that for decades has occupied the wall behind the stage at The Jazz Showcase in Chicago.  At another point, as a set was scheduled to begin but George was still backstage, Parker rejected the pleas of the audience to start:  "No, I'm not going to play anything until George gets back."

An amateur recording of the Parker-Freeman performances in Chicago has been reissued numerous times.  In a 2003 release, prominent music historian and annotator Loren Schoenberg said this about Freeman's playing:  "There is virtually no precedent for the outrageously experimental music that George Freeman creates throughout this set....  His ... solo [on one tune] is unlike anything I have ever heard, and seems much closer to what John Scofield and Bill Frisell have brought to the jazz guitar in the '90s than to anything from his own contemporaries."

Chicago remained Freeman's base of operations throughout the 1950s, but by 1959, he decided to tour again.  He traveled the country with tenorist Sil Austin and vocalist Jackie Wilson for a time, then with organist Wild Bill Davis, and finally with organist Richard "Groove" Holmes, with whom he worked and recorded extensively during the 1960s.  Freeman made the introductions that resulted in Holmes' first record, an album on which Freeman and tenorist Ben Webster appeared.  Another recording highlight with Holmes is The Groover, which features Freeman's unique guitar work extensively along with two of his compositions.

1960-1979: Tour with Gene Ammons, The Black Cat and Birth Sign
While Freeman was spending most of the 1960s touring with Holmes and others, tenor great Gene Ammons was incarcerated south of Chicago on drug charges that some say were trumped up.  Upon his release in 1969, Ammons returned to Chicago and performed with some old colleagues and high school classmates, including Freeman.  Ammons immediately asked Freeman to join Ammons on the front line of a new band he was forming, and Freeman accepted.  Freeman remained a featured member of the Ammons band, with a few interruptions, until Ammons' untimely death from bone cancer in 1974.  The Ammons-Freeman collaboration yielded several recordings, including The Black Cat, the title track of which was written by Freeman (Freeman's original title was George Meets Gene, but the producer in the studio changed it to The Black Cat, remarking to Ammons that he had nothing but bad luck).  Ammons' admiration for Freeman's playing is revealed in a Down Beat interview conducted by longtime jazz writer Leonard Feather.  Ammons expressed a dislike for avant garde jazz music, and in response, Feather countered that Freeman's solos often fell into that category.  Ammons responded:  "I agree.  But George does it in the realm of what's going on otherwise, as far as the rest of the rhythm and the whole situation, and it sounds good."

The Ammons years were especially fertile for Freeman--and his work garnered widespread acclaim.  A 1971 Down Beat issue, entitled MASTERS OF JAZZ GUITAR, showcased Freeman's work along with that of Kenny Burrell and Jim Hall.  Other bandleaders who recognized Freeman's unique talents tried to pry him away from Ammons; most were unsuccessful, but Freeman did accept an offer to join organist Jimmy McGriff for a time.  That partnership resulted in several albums, including Fly Dude from 1972, which features Freeman's guitar and compositions.  Another prominent collaboration from this period was with drummer Buddy Rich and tenorist Illinois Jacquet, a collaboration that also produced an album.

The early 1970s also yielded Freeman's first album as leader, Birth Sign, and several other highly regarded recordings--including Franticdiagnosis from 1972.

1980-1999: Chicago and Rebellion
As the 1970s progressed, Freeman returned again to Chicago, which has remained the epicenter of his activities ever since.  

Freeman resumed his work in local clubs, while at the same time, remained active in the recording studios.  His appearance on Johnny Griffin's 1979 album Bush Dance is one of a number of highlights.  Another is Freeman's 1995 album Rebellion, on which his brother Von holds down the piano chair.

2000-2020: Live engagements and George the Bomb
The 2000s have been an active period for Freeman.  He has recorded multiple albums under his own name, including 90 Going on Amazing, a 2005 album produced and recorded by Sirus XM Jazz Director Mark Ruffin and released by Blujazz in August 2017.  Freeman's other albums in this period have included collaborations with vocalist Kurt Elling, tenorist (and brother Von's son) Chico Freeman, and guitarist Mike Allemana.  In his most recent album, George The Bomb from 2019, Freeman teamed with blues singer and harmonica player Billy Branch.

Freeman also has remained an active performer--playing in New York City and Europe, but mostly, at home in Chicago.  Freeman has been a regular fixture at the annual Chicago Jazz Festival, headlining there with his brother Von, his nephew Chico (in 2015), Mike Allemana (in 2017), and Billy Branch (in 2019).  Freeman also has played regular engagements in jazz clubs and special events for the Jazz Institute of Chicago and the Association for the Advancement of Creative Musicians.

Freeman's full calendar of engagements was scrapped in March 2020 when the Covid-19 pandemic forced the cancellation of public events and the closing of jazz clubs.  Freeman kept himself busy at home for the next year practicing and composing new music.  

2021-present: Everybody Say Yeah!
In April 2021, as vaccines became available and the Chicago clubs started reopening, Freeman returned to live performances with an engagement at The Green Mill Cocktail Lounge, just in time to celebrate his 94th Birthday on April 10.  Freeman remained in demand throughout 2021, headlining the Englewood Jazz Festival on September 18, returning to the Green Mill on October 1-2, and opening the Blues Festival at The University of Chicago’s Logan Center on October 15.

Freeman returned to the Green Mill in Chicago on April 8th and 9th, 2022 for his annual birthday weekend. In celebration of Freeman’s 95th birthday on April 10, 2022, Southport Records released Everybody Say Yeah!,  a new compilation of recordings that document 26 years of Freeman's music from the Chicago label catalog, unreleased tracks, and a new recording of "Perfume" with fellow guitarist Mike Allemana.

Freeman again entered the recording studio on May 7, 2022, leading an all-star trio session with bassist Christian McBride and drummer Carl Allen.  And on June 13, 2022, Freeman led another all-star recording session, this time supported by organist Joey DeFrancesco and drummer Lewis Nash.

Discography
As leader
 Introducing George Freeman Live with Charlie Earland Sitting In (Giant Step, 1971)
 Birth Sign  (Delmark, 1972)
 Franticdiagnosis (Bam-Boo, 1972)
 Man & Woman (Groove Merchant, 1974)
 New Improved Funk (Groove Merchant, 1974)
 Rebellion (Southport, 1995)
 George Burns! (Southport, 1999)
 At Long Last George (Savant, 2001)
 All in the Family with Chico Freeman (Southport, 2015)
 Live at the Green Mill with Mike Allemana (Ears&eyes, 2017)
 90 Going On Amazing (Blujazz, 2017)
 George the Bomb (Southport, 2019)
 Everybody Say Yeah! (Southport, 2022)

As sidemanWith Gene Ammons Hooray for John Coltrane, Gene Ammons (Session, 1970s)
 The Black Cat! (Prestige, 1971)
 You Talk That Talk! (Prestige, 1971)
 Swingin' the Jug (Roots, 1976)With Richard "Groove" Holmes "Groove" (Pacific Jazz, 1961)
 Tell It Like It Tis (Pacific Jazz, 1966)
 Welcome Home (World Pacific Jazz, 1968)
 The Groover! (Prestige, 1968)With Jimmy McGriff Fly Dude (Groove Merchant, 1972)
 Concert: Friday the 13th - Cook County Jail with Eli Lucky Thompson (Groove Merchant, 1973)
 Giants of the Organ Come Together with Richard "Groove" Holmes (Groove Merchant, 1973)
 100% Pure Funk (LRC, 2001)With others'''
 Mickey Fields, The Astonishing Mickey Fields (Edmar, 1960s)
 Johnny Griffin, Bush Dance (Galaxy, 1979)
 Red Holloway, Go Red Go! (Delmark, 2009)
 Illinois Jacquet, Loot to Boot (LRC, 1991)
 Les McCann, Oh Brother! (Fontana, 1964)
 Joe Morris, 1946–1949 (Classics, 2003)
 Charlie Parker, An Evening at Home with the Bird (Savoy, 1961)
 Charlie Parker, One Night in Chicago (Savoy, 1980)
 Buddy Rich, The Last Blues Album Volume 1 (Groove Merchant, 1974)
 Shirley Scott, Mystical Lady'' (Cadet, 1971)

References

Living people
1927 births
American jazz guitarists
20th-century American guitarists